The largest creative work is the largest or longest item in different fields of creative works.  Some pieces were created with the specific intention of holding the record while others have been recognised for their size after completion.

Literature

The largest known general encyclopedia is the Yongle Encyclopedia commissioned by the Yongle Emperor of China's Ming dynasty in 1403.  It comprised 22,937 manuscript scrolls in 11,095 volumes, occupying .
The longest poem in any language is the Mahabharata, with more than 100,000 couplets.
The longest epic cycle is the Tibetan Epic of King Gesar, which contains over 20 million words in more than one million verses.

Performing arts

Film
Logistics, directed by Erika Magnusson and Daniel Andersson, is officially the world's longest film.  Running 51,420 minutes (857 hours) in length, the film follows the production cycle of a pedometer in reverse chronological order.

Music
The longest musical performance began on 1 January 2000 and is set to last for 1000 years before repeating. Composed by Jem Finer, Longplayer is played in a 19th-century lighthouse near Canary Wharf, London, and other public listening posts.

Television
The longest-running American television series is Meet the Press, a news program which started on 6 November 1947 and continues today.

Theatre
The Mousetrap had been running continuously in London from 1952 to 16 March 2020, when it closed due to the COVID-19 pandemic. It has by far the longest initial run of any play in history, with more than 25,000 performances taking place, and the longest running show (of any type) of the modern era.

Visual arts

Painting
The largest painting by a single-artist according to the International Guinness Book of World Records was completed by Ðuka Siroglavic. It measured  and was created in Bol, Croatia, between 15 February and 15 July 2007. Previous record holders included David Aberg's  "Mother Earth," (2006) and an Eric Waugh's , "Hero" (2002).

Sculpture
The largest contemporary artwork and largest land art sculpture is "City" by Michael Heizer, located at 38.034°, -115.443° in rural Lincoln County in the U.S. state of Nevada.

Textiles
The world's largest hand woven carpet is a Persian carpet made in Iran and completed in 2007.

See also
Louvre – the world's largest art gallery
List of largest buildings
Unfinished creative work

References

Creative work
Superlatives